The PC-FX is a 32-bit home video game console developed and designed by NEC that was only released in Japan on December 23, 1994. It is the successor to the PC Engine, also known as TurboGrafx-16 in North America and TurboGrafx in Europe. The following list contains all of the games released for the PC-FX.

Announced in late 1993 and released just a few weeks after the PlayStation and a month after the Sega Saturn in the region, the PC-FX is unique among fifth generation consoles for its computer-like design, full motion video capabilities, and lack of a 3D graphics processor. The system was discontinued in early 1998 and sold only 400,000 units over its lifetime. It was also NEC's last home video game console released to market. The launch titles were Battle Heat!, Sotsugyō II: Neo Generation FX and Team Innocent: The Point of No Return, with its final game released being First Kiss Story.

Games 
Listed here are all  officially released PC-FX games.

Notes

References

External links 
 List of PC-FX games at MobyGames

PC-FX